Tomas Lekūnas (born April 6, 1993 in Lithuania) is a Lithuanian professional basketball player, currently playing for Rytas Vilnius of the Lithuanian Basketball League (LKL).

Professional career
Lekūnas started his professional career in KK Akademija Vilnius in 2010.

International career
He won silver medal with Lithuania U-16 national team in 2009 FIBA Europe Under-16 Championship.

In 2010, while preparing for 2010 FIBA Europe Under-20 Championship, Lekūnas alongside teammate Edgaras Zinevičius were removed from team roster, because of disciplinary violation.

References

1993 births
Living people
BC Dzūkija players
BC Pieno žvaigždės players
BC Šiauliai players
Lithuanian men's basketball players
People from Biržai
Power forwards (basketball)
Small forwards